Boronia cymosa, commonly known as granite boronia, is a plant in the citrus family Rutaceae and is endemic to the south-west of Western Australia. It is an erect shrub with linear, more or less cylindrical leaves and groups of relatively small, pink four-petalled flowers arranged on branched flowering stems.

Description
The flowers are relatively small and arranged in groups on branching flowering stems, the groups with a long peduncle, each flower on a short pedicel. The eight stamens are hairy. Flowering mainly occurs from May to November.

Taxonomy and naming
Boronia cymosa was first formally described in 1837 by Stephan Endlicher and the description was published in Enumeratio plantarum quas in Novae Hollandiae ora austro-occidentali ad fluvium Cygnorum et in sinu Regis Georgii collegit Carolus Liber Baro de Hügel.

Distribution and habitat
Granite boronia grows on granite outcrops, rocky hillsides and sandplains in the Avon Wheatbelt, Carnarvon, Geraldton Sandplains, Jarrah Forest, Swan Coastal Plain and Yalgoo biogeographic regions of Western Australia.

Conservation
Boronia cymosa is listed as "not threatened" by the Government of Western Australia Department of Parks and Wildlife.

References 

cymosa
Flora of Western Australia
Plants described in 1837
Taxa named by Stephan Endlicher